Christopher Oakley may refer to:

Christopher Oakley (animator), American artist and animator
Christopher Oakley (historian), American historian